PLTD Apung 1 is a tourist attraction and former active duty electric generator ship, stranded on dry land in Banda Aceh, Sumatra, Indonesia. The Apung 1, then owned by the local power generating company, crashed upon two homes when she was taken ashore, killing those inside. Visitors can enter the ship and explore the interior in its entirety.

The government gave Apung 1 to Aceh during the Aceh conflict between the government and the Free Aceh Movement (Gerakan Aceh Merdeka, or GAM). In 2012–2013, the boat was renovated and now has two towers, a monument, a flying walk, a jogging area, and a fountain.

References

Tourism in Indonesia
Ships of Indonesia
Shipwrecks of Indonesia
2004 Indian Ocean earthquake and tsunami
Museum ships in Indonesia